The Moorcock Inn is a public house at the watershed of the Eden, Clough and Ure rivers, in Upper Wensleydale, North Yorkshire, England. It is adjacent to the A684 road where it has a junction with the B6259 road, and near to  railway station on the Settle–Carlisle line. The history of the inn can be traced back to the 1740s, but it has only been named The Moorcock since 1840. The pub is near to some long-distance paths, and is popular with walkers.

History 
The pub, whose building dates from the 1740s, is located at a remote road junction at the head of Wensleydale and is named on Ordnance Survey mapping. The name of the pub previous to 1840 was listed as The Guide Post Inn. The pub was popular with railway navvies in the 1870s, who were accommodated in a camp near the pub to build the Settle Carlisle and the Wensleydale Line to Hawes. Some of the navvies who drank there whilst building the Settle-Carlisle Line in the 1870s referred to it as The Junction Inn. During this time it was fined for "allowing drunkeness [and] serving outside of permitted hours". 

After a train crash at nearby Ais Gill in 1910, twelve bodies were stored in the pub until they were able to be buried at Hawes, and the preliminary inquiry into the crash was held there, as it was "the largest room for miles..". In 1975, the landlords died in a fire on the day of their retirement party.

Due to its height at the west end of Wensleydale, the Moorcock is known to be the wettest place in Wensleydale, averaging a rainfall of  a year. The route of the B6259 was built in 1825 as an alternative to the through road to Mallerstang from Cotterdale. Between Monday and Friday, four buses per day in each direction connect Garsdale railway station and the Morcock Inn with Hawes.

References 

Pubs in North Yorkshire